Dunham River is a river in the Kimberley region of Western Australia.

The river rises between the Durack Range and the O'Donnell Range then flows north-west parallel with the Great Northern Highway to the east and the Bedford Stock Route to the west. The river then crosses the Great Northern Highway near Cabbage Tree Creek and continues north-west crossing the Victoria Highway and discharging into the Ord River west of Kununurra.

There are five tributaries of the Dunham; Cabbage Tree Creek, Pelican Creek, Macphee Creek, Rabbit Creek and Pumpkin Lookout Creek.

The river flows through one permanent waterhole, Flying Fox waterhole, toward the end of its journey.

The river is prone to flooding during rain events. In March 2000, the peak flow of the river was estimated at 2700 m3 s−1 during floods.

The river was named in 1882 by explorer and Kimberley pioneer Michael Durack after the clergyman, Father Dunham of Brisbane, who in 1871 was the first priest to visit Cooper Creek in outback Queensland.

References 

Rivers of the Kimberley region of Western Australia